Lupton is an unincorporated community and census-designated place (CDP) in Apache County, Arizona, United States. Lupton has a post office with ZIP code 86508. As of the 2010 census, the Lupton CDP had a population of 25.

Demographics

History 

Lupton was established in 1905 by trainmaster G. W. Lupton. Col. John Washington passed by here in his 1864 Navajo Campaign.

Education
It is in the Sanders Unified School District.

References

Census-designated places in Apache County, Arizona